John William Thomas (January 4, 1874 – November 10, 1945) was an American politician, a United States Senator from Idaho.  A Republican, he served for a total of over ten years in two different seats, both times appointed after his predecessor died in office. He won three of the four elections for senator, falling only in the Democratic landslide of 1932, and died in office.

Early life
Born on a farm in northern Kansas near Prairie View in Phillips County, Thomas attended the rural schools and the Central Normal College at Great Bend. He taught school, serving as superintendent of schools of Phillips County in Phillipsburg from 1898 to 1903, and as register of land office at Colby from 1906 to 1909, then moved west to south central Idaho and settled at Gooding, where he engaged in banking and livestock business.

Political life
Thomas was elected mayor of Gooding in 1917 for a two-year term, and was a member of the Republican National Committee from 1925 to 1933.

He was appointed to the U.S. Senate for the first time in 1928 to fill the vacancy caused by the death of his political mentor, Frank Gooding, by Governor H. C. Baldridge. Thomas won the special election later that year to finish the four years of the term, and chaired the Senate Committee on Irrigation and Reclamation from 1929 to 1933. Losing support from the progressives late in the term, he was defeated for re-election in 1932 by Democrat James Pope.

After his 1932 defeat, Thomas resumed his former business pursuits. He was appointed to the Senate again in 1940, this time by Governor C. A. Bottolfsen, to fill the vacancy caused by the death of William Borah, the dean of the Senate. Thomas won another special election to finish the term later that year, and was elected to a full term in 1942, both times defeating Democrat Glen H. Taylor, and died in office three years later.

Election results

Family
Married in Kansas in 1906, Thomas and his wife Florence (1873–1943) had a daughter, Mary Elizabeth Thomas Peavey Brooks (1907–2002), who became a state senator in the 1960s and was the director of the U.S. Mint in the 1970s. Widowed in 1941, Mary moved her young family to Washington, D.C. after her mother's death in 1943. Three years later, she  married C. Wayland Brooks, a U.S. Senator from Illinois who had served with her father. Her son, John Peavey (b. 1933), served for over two decades in the Idaho state senate, switching parties in 1978, and was the Democratic nominee for lieutenant governor in 1994.

Death
Thomas had been in failing health for over a year and died in 1945 at age 71 of a cerebral hemorrhage at George Washington University Hospital in Washington, D.C. His wife Florence  had died more than two years earlier, also from a cerebral hemorrhage. They are buried at Elmwood Cemetery in Gooding.

See also
 List of United States Congress members who died in office (1900–49)

Notes

References

External links
 
South Fork Companion – Senator John W. Thomas
 

Idaho Republicans
People from Gooding, Idaho
Ranchers from Idaho
1874 births
1945 deaths
Republican Party United States senators from Idaho
People from Phillips County, Kansas
Burials at Elmwood Cemetery (Gooding, Idaho)